Harischandra is a 1944 Indian Tamil-language film directed by K. Nagabhushanam and written by T. C. Vadivel Nayakar, starring P. U. Chinnappa and P. Kannamba. It is based on the legend of king Harishchandra.

Cast
The list was adapted from the film titles

Chinnappa as Harischandran
Kannamba as Chandramadhi
Krishnan as Kalakandan
Mathuram as Kalakandi
R. Balasubramaniam as Viswamitra
L. Narayana Rao as Nakshathreyan
M. R. Saminathan as  Veera Bahu

M. G. Ramachandran as Sathyakeerthi
Kothamangalam Vasu as Vashistar
Master Sethuraman as Logidasan
Rajagopala Iyer as Paramasivan
P. S. Chandra as Chelli
Mangalam, Yogambal as Bar Girls
Sarathambal as Parvathi

Production
Art was done by Hari Babu. Choreography was handled by Meenakshi Sundaram Pillai. Cinematography was handled by Kamal Ghosh.

Soundtrack
The songs were composed by S. V. Venkatraman and the background music was composed by S. Rajeswara Rao. The lyrics were written by C. A. Lakshmana Das. Finally, the songs were recorded by B. Ranga Rao.

References

1940s Tamil-language films
1944 films
Indian black-and-white films